Tanaka-Iga Butsugu (田中伊雅仏具) is a Japanese company that produces Buddhist goods, including  butsudan shrines that are placed in many traditional Japanese homes. It is one of the oldest companies on Earth, being founded in the ninth century and operating continuously since. The company produces sophisticated and expensive objects and now uses 3-D computer mock-ups of complex items before production, like the altar and other furniture temples.

History 
In approximately 885 C.E.,in Heian Period Tanaka-Iga was founded in Japan. Due to its age, it is the oldest selling Buddhist religious items. Currently, it is based in the Japanese city of Kyoto at Manjuji Nishinotoin in Shimogyo-ku. Its 70th-generation president is Masakazu Tanaka.

References

External links
 Official website 

9th-century establishments in Japan
Companies established in the 9th century
Manufacturing companies based in Kyoto
Buddhism in Japan